Parapielus luteicornis is a moth of the family Hepialidae. It is found in Argentina and Chile.

References

Moths described in 1882
Hepialidae